Ofelia Maivia (born Ofelia Fuataga; August 6, 1931 – October 19, 2008) was a Samoan professional wrestling promoter. Maivia was the wife of Samoan professional wrestler Peter Maivia and the grandmother of actor and wrestler, Dwayne Johnson, also known as The Rock.

Professional wrestling career
Maivia took over the Polynesian Pro Wrestling (PPW), a territory of the National Wrestling Alliance in Hawaii, following the death of her husband, "High Chief" Peter Maivia, in 1982. She became one of wrestling's first female promoters. In the mid-1980s, her promotion ran a show called Polynesian Pacific Pro Wrestling on the Financial News Network. Her biggest card, A Hot Summer Night, occurred on 3 August 1985 and had a crowd of 20,000. Her show the following year, A Hot Summer Night II, did not do as well, and the promotion began to decline. Maivia, her booker Lars Anderson, and Ati So'O faced extortion charges from a competing Hawaiian promotion, but were acquitted in November 1989. PPW closed in 1988.

In 2018, Maivia's grandson, Dwayne Johnson gave an interview on The Late Show with Stephen Colbert, in which Johnson recounts that his grandfather 'High Chief' Peter Maivia, at the beginning of his career, never told his wife of the choreography of wrestling, leading Maivia to believe it was "real fighting". When Johnson's grandfather was in a match in San Francisco, and was getting beaten by his opponent, Lia Maivia came into the ring, and started beating her husband's opponent with her wooden clog shoe leading Peter Maivia to shout in Samoan to stop beating his opponent up and that the opponent was Maivia's friend.

Personal life
Lia Maivia had one daughter, Mataniufeagaimaleata Fitisemanu (Ata Fitisemanu), with her first husband Sione Papali'i Fitisemanu. After she married Peter Maivia he adopted her daughter and changed her name to Ata Fitisemanu Maivia. Ata and her ex-husband Rocky Johnson are the parents of Dwayne "The Rock" Johnson.

Maivia died of a heart attack at her home in Davie, Florida, on 19 October 2008. There were conflicting reports of her age, as most outlets reported that she was 81 years old, while The Miami Herald reported that she was 77. The Anoa'i family established the "Lia Maivia Scholarship" in her honor.

Bill Apter, a writer and journalist who specializes in wrestling, wrote of Maivia following her death: "When my daughter Hailey, who is now 23, met Lia at a wrestling event in upper New York state, Lia went to a gift shop at a nearby hotel and bought Hailey a stuffed rabbit as a gift. She had never met her before this day, and this shows what a heart she had!" Greg Oliver, another professional wrestling journalist, wrote that Maivia "was considered a strong-willed businesswoman, demanding and challenging of her employees."

Her life is featured in most episodes of Young Rock, an autobiographical series based on the life of Dwayne Johnson. In the series, she's portrayed by Ana Tuisila.

See also
Anoaʻi family

References 

1927 births
2008 deaths
Anoa'i family
People from Atua (district)
People from Davie, Florida
Professional wrestling promoters
Samoan emigrants to the United States